"I Want You Back" is a song by English girl group Bananarama from their fourth studio album, Wow! (1987). It was released on 28 March 1988 as the album's fourth and final single. The track was co-written and produced by the Stock Aitken Waterman (SAW) trio.

The song originally had a different chorus and was titled "Reason for Living". Bananarama disliked this chorus and co-wrote the revised lyrics for "I Want You Back". Both versions were originally recorded with Siobhan Fahey for the 1987 Wow! album. For the April 1988 single release, the song was re-recorded with Jacquie O'Sullivan, who had replaced Fahey in March 1988. "Reason for Living" was included on the deluxe version of Wow!, which was released in 2013. Elements of the original chorus can be heard in both the original Wow! version of "I Want You Back" and in the Extended European Mix of the 1988 single release.

"I Want You Back" became one of Bananarama's highest-charting singles, peaking at number five on the UK Singles Chart. It also climbed into the top three in Australia and the top 10 in New Zealand. The single was not released in the United States.

In 2021, British magazine Classic Pop ranked it number 29 in their list of "Top 40 Stock Aitken Waterman songs".

Critical reception
James Hamilton from Record Mirror wrote in his dance column, "Breezily jaunty (what else!) bpm thudding pop chugger with the girls' usual shrill trademarks".

Music video
The accompanying music video for "I Want You Back" featured the group performing the song in various scenarios. One has the three girls performing a choreographed dance routine before the camera. Another has them acting silly, dancing spontaneously, and humorously fighting for screen time. Another scenario features the girls performing their dance routine dressed in silver gowns, wigs and skin darkening makeup as The Supremes. These scenes are interspersed with go-go boys dancing with wigs or in cages clad only in briefs and glow-in-the-dark body paint. An alternative version exists with a scenario of the girls in long wigs replacing the choreographed dance routine scenes. Both videos were directed by Andy Morahan.

Track listings
7-inch single (NANA 16)
"I Want You Back" (single version) – 3:47
"Bad for Me" – 3:37

10-inch gatefold single (NANG 16)
"I Want You Back" (single version) – 3:47
"Bananarama Megamix" (edit) – 6:15

12-inch single (NANX 16)
"I Want You Back" (extended European version) – 7:56
"Amnesia" (extended 12″ version) (theme from The Roxy) – 6:28
M. Stock/M. Aitken/P. Waterman, :Remixed by Extra Beat Boys
"Bad for Me" – 3:37

CD single (NANCD 16)
"I Want You Back" (single version) – 3:47
"Bad for Me" – 3:37
"Amnesia" (extended 12" version) (Theme from The Roxy) – 6:28
"Love in the First Degree" (house remix) – 5:45
Remixed by Pete Hammond and edited by Phil Harding 

Other versions
"I Want You Back" (LP version) – 3:53
Taken from the album Wow!

Personnel
Sara Dallin – vocals
Keren Woodward – vocals
Siobhan Fahey – vocals
Jacquie O'Sullivan – vocals (single)

Charts

Weekly charts

Year-end charts

References

1987 songs
1988 singles
Bananarama songs
London Records singles
Music videos directed by Andy Morahan
Song recordings produced by Stock Aitken Waterman
Songs written by Keren Woodward
Songs written by Sara Dallin
Songs written by Siobhan Fahey
Songs written by Matt Aitken
Songs written by Mike Stock (musician)
Songs written by Pete Waterman